The Big Hill Pond Fortification is a Civil War earthwork in Big Hill Pond State Park, which is located in McNairy County, Tennessee.

The earthwork was built atop a ridge by the Union Army in late 1862, after the Battle of Davis Bridge. It was built to guard the nearby Memphis and Charleston Railroad line. It is considered an archaeological site and was listed on the National Register of Historic Places in 1998.

References

Archaeological sites on the National Register of Historic Places in Tennessee
Military installations established in 1862
Buildings and structures in McNairy County, Tennessee
1862 establishments in Tennessee
Military facilities on the National Register of Historic Places in Tennessee
National Register of Historic Places in McNairy County, Tennessee
American Civil War on the National Register of Historic Places